The 1998 Majorca Open was an Association of Tennis Professionals men's tennis tournament played on outdoor clay courts in Majorca, Spain that was part of the World Series category of the 1998 ATP Tour. It was the fourth edition of the tournament and was held from 28 September to 5 October 1998. Eighth-seeded Gustavo Kuerten won the singles title.

Finals

Singles

 Gustavo Kuerten defeated  Carlos Moyà 6–7(5–7), 6–2, 6–3
 It was Kuerten's 2nd singles title of the year and the 3rd of his career.

Doubles

 Pablo Albano /  Daniel Orsanic defeated  Jiří Novák /  David Rikl 7–6, 6–3
 It was Albano's only title of the year and the 7th of his career. It was Orsanic's 2nd title of the year and the 5th of his career.

References

External links 
 ITF tournament edition details

 
Marbella Open